The black-chinned robin (Poecilodryas brachyura) is a species of bird in the family Petroicidae. It is found in northern New Guinea. Its natural habitat is subtropical or tropical moist lowland forests.

Described by English naturalist, Philip Sclater, in 1874, the black-chinned robin is a member of the Australasian robin family Petroicidae. Sibley and Ahlquist's DNA-DNA hybridisation studies placed this group in a Corvida parvorder comprising many tropical and Australian passerines, including pardalotes, fairy-wrens, honeyeaters, and crows. However, subsequent molecular research (and current consensus) places the robins as a very early offshoot of the Passerida (or "advanced" songbirds) within the songbird lineage.

Measuring 14 to 15 cm (5.5–6 in), the black-chinned robin has a dark brown to black head and upperparts, with a prominent white stripe or "eyebrow" above the eye. The chin is black immediately under the bill. Its tail is markedly shorter than other Australasian robins. The throat and underparts are white, and there is a white bar on the otherwise dark-plumaged wing. The bill is black, the eyes are dark brown, and the legs pale brown or pink. Its song is a descending series of notes, which resembles that of the fan-tailed cuckoo.

The black-chinned robin is found predominantly in the lowland forests of northwestern and central New Guinea (mainly in West Papua and only a little in Papua New Guinea's northwest) from sea level to 650 m (2000 ft). Within the rainforest it is found in pairs in the understory or on the ground. It is insectivorous, and hunts by gleaning. It is a weak flyer.

References

black-chinned robin
Birds of New Guinea
black-chinned robin
black-chinned robin
Taxonomy articles created by Polbot